The  is an emergency service unit placed under the Japanese Ministry of Justice's Correction Bureau. It is based at the Tokyo Detention House.

According to Norio Saeki, Director of the Correction Bureau, SeRT is tasked to handle anti-riot and disaster operations at CB-manned facilities without diverting manpower from various police or fire departments.

Captain Hiromichi Ouchi is the SeRT's current commanding officer. Captain Shinjiro Nagase is the SeRT Deputy Captain.

History
The SeRT was established on April 1, 2019, at the grounds of the Tokyo Detention House. On June 3, 2019, the unit was awarded the commander's flag by Ministry of Justice Takashi Yamashita. The SeRT allowed the Correction Bureau to have a full-time anti-riot response unit as the CB formerly used temporary anti-riot teams consisting of CB guards and to ensure security of CB-manned correctional facilities.

In the aftermath of the 2021 Atami landslide, a humanitarian operation was underway in Atami, Shizuoka. 19 officers were dispatched to work with Atami City officials and the Atami Police Station on July 18 to provide support in traffic duties and protection of restricted areas. After Typhoon Hagibis made landfall at Izu Peninsula in Shizuoka Prefecture, 13 SeRT officers were deployed to Suzaka, Nagano to provide assistance for waste disposal and provide facility security from October 19 to 23. From October 23, 14 SeRT officers were deployed to the city up to October 27.

On December 2, 2021, SeRT has publicly shown a Mazda CX-8 that would serve as a commander vehicle, equipped with red emergency lights, front sensor, radio and loudspeaker microphone. It was previously delivered to the Ministry of Justice in November 2021.

Organization
SeRT is composed of 56 officers, including the captain in charge.

Tasks
SeRT is tasked with the following responsibilities:

 Riots and other serious incidents such as prison breaks and attacks inside prisons, detention centers and juvenile training schools. 
 Anti-terrorist operations in and around prisons, detention centers and juvenile training schools.
 Dispatch to disaster areas for humanitarian operations, including operation of emergency shelters.
 Conduct disaster relief operations in correctional facilities after a tsunami or an earthquake under scale intensity of six or higher.

Notes

References

Prisons in Japan
2019 establishments in Japan
Non-military counterterrorist organizations